Tirunelveli is an assembly constituency located in Tirunelveli Lok Sabha Constituency in Tamil Nadu. It is one of the oldest assembly segments in Tamil Nadu since Independence. Tirunelveli was one of 17 assembly constituencies to have VVPAT facility with EVMs in 2016 Tamil Nadu Legislative Assembly election. Tirunelveli voted for the party that forms government in the state except for 2016 and 2021 respectively.
It is one of the 234 State Legislative Assembly Constituencies in Tamil Nadu.

Madras State assembly

Tamil Nadu assembly

Election Results

2021

2016

2011

2006

2001

1996

1991

1989

1984

1980

1977

1971

1967

1962

1957

1952

References 

 

Assembly constituencies of Tamil Nadu
Tirunelveli